Rokometno društvo Škofja Loka, commonly referred to as RD Loka or simply Loka, was a handball club from Škofja Loka, Slovenia. The club was also known as RD Merkur due to sponsorship reasons. The club was dissolved in late 2011 due to bankruptcy. A new club called RD Loka 2012 was established in 2012.

References

Slovenian handball clubs
Škofja Loka
Sports clubs disestablished in 2011